Once Upon a Time in Hong Kong may refer to:

Once Upon a Time in Hong Kong (2021 film), a 2021 film co-directed by Wong Jing and Woody Hui
Once Upon a Time in Hong Kong (upcoming film), an upcoming film directed by Felix Chong and starring Andy Lau & Tony Leung